Marcelo Melo and André Sá were the defending champions, but lost in the semifinals against Julian Knowle and Jürgen Melzer.

Julian Knowle and Jürgen Melzer won in the final 6–4, 7-6(3) against Bruno Soares and Kevin Ullyett.

Seeds

  Mariusz Fyrstenberg /  Marcin Matkowski (first round)
  Bruno Soares /  Kevin Ullyett (final)
  František Čermák /  Michal Mertiňák (quarterfinals)
  Martin Damm /  Robert Lindstedt (semifinals)

Draw

External links
 Main Draw

Men's Doubles